George Orwell: A Life in Pictures is a 2003 BBC Television docudrama telling the life story of the British author George Orwell. Chris Langham plays the part of Orwell. No surviving sound recordings or video of the real George Orwell have been found.

Awards
International Academy of Television Arts and Sciences 2004
International Emmy for Best Arts Programme
Grierson Awards 2004
Grierson Award for Best Documentary on the Arts

References

External links 
 

BBC television docudramas
International Emmy Award for Best Arts Programming winners